Babatunde Okungbowa,  popularly known by his stage name OJB Jezreel or OJB, was a Nigerian singer-songwriter and record producer. He died on June 14, 2016 of kidney disease.

Early life 
Babatunde Okungbowa a.k.a. OJB Jezreel was born on July 4, 1966 in Lagos to Chief Anthony Okungbowa & Isabella Abiodun Okungbowa (Nee Pinheiro) in a matrimony that produced 5 others. He was the last child of his mum.

He attended Yewande Memorial Primary School & Mainland Preparatory Elementary School between 1972 - 1977.

He graduated from Federal Government College, Ijanikin in 1986 where he organized a music concert while he was a student of the school.

OJB furthered his education at Lagos College of Education and Liter-way College, Holland, Year 1987-1990. However, in true pursuit of his passion and a real career, he decided to follow his path in life as an artiste/music producer.

For the prolific producer, music started back in 1986. The artiste started making beats in back room studios, first in his Surulere neighbourhood and later in other parts of the city.

His first son  Ayokunle Okungbowa is the rising Gospel artist also known as Ayo Jezreel

Career
OJB Jezreel was a seasoned producer and a great musician. Over the years, he has produced some of the greatest hit albums and singles in the history of R&B hip-hop and afrobeat music in the entertainment scene in Africa.

He worked with 2face Idibia which is the greatest thing that came out of Africa to the world. OJB Jezreel single handedly produced 'Face 2 Face', the album that contained tracks like African Queen that took 2Baba to another level.

He has worked with Beenie Man, a Jamaican American-based musician.

He produced artistes like RuggedMan re-establishing rap music to gain its ground in Nigeria. He also produced Jazzman Olofin, Weird MC, Paul Ik Dairo, Daddy Showkey, Sir Shina Peters, Olu Maintain.

OJB also produced albums and songs for Kcee, Faze, Iyanya, D'banj, Durella, Wizkid, Yemi Alade etc. to mention a few.

He made so much impact in the music industry thereby making Nigeria the cradle of entertainment in Africa also emerging a spotlight in Africa, he remains the greatest producer ever to emerge from the continent Africa.

As a musician he is one of the greatest vocalists and by virtue of years of experience as a producer he has been able to impact his gathered knowledge into his style of music thereby making him Mr. versatile in his last album ‘No Drama’ with great hit songs like ‘Searching’ and ‘Pretete’ which created so much impact that it sold close to one million copies in less than 4 weeks without the push and promotion of a record label. If you call OJB Mr. versatile, he is.

Discography

Production 
Albums
2face Idibia - Face 2 Face

Singles 
 Pretete
 Searching
 Beautiful As You Are
 Soldier
 Pon Pon
 Shitta Anthem
 Gbemileke
 Keys To My Heart
 Oleku
 Follow Me ft Goody Goody
 I Believe
 I Don Tire
 Missing You
 No More
 Malaika
 Dallu
 Wan Yoh Ma
 Get There
 What It Gonna Be

Personal life 
OJB was married to three wives, Mabel, June & Korede with eight children between them.

The respected music producer and singer battled with Kidney problems since 2013. He was consequently flown to India for a transplant in 2013. With his kidney experience, he decided to set up a Foundation, ‘OJB Foundation’ to help people with kidney problems in appreciation to God for saving his life.

However, his kidney transplant failed again a week before his demise and OJB passed on. He is survived by his wife Mabel and her 3 children, June and her 3 Children Denzel, Emmanuel & Zion, and Korede and her 2 children Damilare & Ifebiyi.

OJB was buried on the 8th of July, 2016.

Awards 
 Best Producer At Faith Award 2000
 Best Duo Group At Faith Award 2000
 Best Song At Faith Award 2000
 Best Pop At Faith Award 2000
 My Mic My Sway ( Recognition award for his Inspiration & Contribution to African Youth)
 NEA Honours (Nigerian Entertainment Awards) In recognition of his outstanding contributions to the Nigeria Entertainment Industry.
 Outstanding Achievers Award From Y’S Dom Of Black Kulture Inc.
 Best Music Producer, Nigeria Music Award Owerri
 Dynamic Global Concepts Award

Filmography 
Anjola 2015

References

1966 births
2016 deaths
Nigerian hip hop singers
Nigerian singer-songwriters
Nigerian hip hop record producers